Fernando Menegazzo (born 3 May 1981), simply known as Fernando, is a former Brazilian professional footballer who played as a central midfielder.

Career
Fernando was born in Anita Garibaldi. He joined French Ligue 1 side FC Girondins de Bordeaux in summer 2005, on loan from A.C. Siena. He made the move permanent a year later and played an important role as Bordeaux finished as runners-up in the 2005–06 Ligue 1 season, qualifying for the 2006–07 UEFA Champions League.

In the summer of 2007, despite several of his teammates leaving the club, such as Julien Faubert, Stéphane Dalmat, Rio Mavuba and Vladimír Šmicer, he signed a new four-year contract with Bordeaux.

He also won the 2007 Copa América with Brazil.

On 16 June 2011, Fernando signed a three-year deal with Saudi Arabian club Al-Shabab at the request of coach Michel Preud'homme. He moved to Club Brugge KV in June 2014, again at Preud'homme's request. He left the club in December 2014.

Honours

Club
Al-Shabab
 Saudi Premier League: 2011–12
 King Cup of Champions: 2014; Runner-up: 2013

Bordeaux
 Ligue 1: 2008–09
 Coupe de la Ligue: 2006–07, 2008–09
 Trophée des Champions: 2008, 2009

International
Brazil
Copa América: 2007

References

External links

Living people
1981 births
Sportspeople from Rio Grande do Sul
Association football midfielders
Brazilian footballers
Brazilian expatriate footballers
Brazil international footballers
Brazil under-20 international footballers
2001 Copa América players
2007 Copa América players
Esporte Clube Juventude players
Grêmio Foot-Ball Porto Alegrense players
A.C.N. Siena 1904 players
Catania S.S.D. players
FC Girondins de Bordeaux players
Al-Shabab FC (Riyadh) players
Club Brugge KV players
Serie A players
Serie B players
Ligue 1 players
Belgian Pro League players
Saudi Professional League players
Expatriate footballers in Belgium
Expatriate footballers in France
Expatriate footballers in Italy
Expatriate footballers in Saudi Arabia
Brazilian people of Italian descent
Copa América-winning players